Riding Mountain may refer to:

 Riding Mountain National Park in Manitoba, Canada
 Riding Mountain Biosphere Reserve in Manitoba, Canada
 Riding Mountain House, a Hudson's Bay Trading post in Manitoba, Canada
 Riding Mountain Airport, near the park
 Riding Mountain Broadcasting, a Manitoba radio station
 Riding Mountain (electoral district), an electoral district in Manitoba